Pixel (established 2011 in Oslo, Norway) is a Norwegian experimental jazz band.

Biography 
The debut album Reminder (2012) by Pixel was well received. This is one of the most exciting bands to come out of the extremely active Norwegian jazz scene in recent years (2011-13).
All About Jazz critique Bruce Lindsay states:
{| class="wikitable"
|-
|... Reminder is an impressive first outing. Pixel bring a unique creative mix to the scene: difficult music to categorize, easy music to enjoy...
|}
Pixel combine the sounds of the classic, piano-less, ‘modern Jazz’ quartet lineup of saxophone, trumpet, bass and drums like Ornette Coleman, Gerry Mulligan etc., and yet carries the energy and attitude of indie rock (all of the players are born about 1986). Led by bassist and vocalist Ellen Andrea Wang, Pixel has been together a couple of years (2013). The band members are all very active on the Scandinavian jazz scene, as is Pixel themselves. Like similarly forward thinking groups like The Bad Plus, this is definitely jazz, but it’s jazz that rock audiences can relate to, and it has great cross-over potential. The gig by «Pixel», was noted as "one of the most memorable moments" of the Match and Fuse Festival, by the Jazz magazine Down Beat. Their concert at Jazz Baltica festival of 24 June 2017 was recorded and was broadcast by the German national public radio "Deutschlandfunk" all over Germany. Parts of the concert are also published at YouTube.

Saxophone player Harald Lassen left the band in 2017

 Band members 
Ellen Andrea Wang - double bass and vocals
Jonas Kilmork Vemøy - trumpet
Harald Lassen - saxophone (2010 - 2017)
Jon Audun Baar - drums

 Honors 
2013: Featured at Young Nordic Jazz Comets

 Discography 

2012: Reminder (Cuneiform Records)
2013: We Are All Small Pixels (Cuneiform Records)
2015: Golden Years'' (Cuneiform Records)

References

External links

Pixel - Call me (Music video, 2012) at YouTube
Pixel - playing Home/Esset (live at National Jazzscene Norway October 26, 2010) at YouTube

Norwegian jazz ensembles
Norwegian experimental musical groups
Musical groups established in 2011
Musical groups from Oslo
2011 establishments in Norway